The 2011 Phillip Island Superbike World Championship round was the first round of the 2011 Superbike World Championship season. It took place over the weekend of 25–27 February 2011 at the Phillip Island Grand Prix Circuit near Cowes, Victoria, Australia.

Results

Superbike Race 1 classification

Superbike Race 2 classification

Supersport race classification

External links
 The official website of the Phillip Island Grand Prix Circuit
 The official website of the Superbike World Championship

Motorsport at Phillip Island
Superbike World Championship round
Phillip Island